Bernadette Charleux is a French polymer chemist. She is a member of the Academia Europaea and a senior member of the Institut universitaire de France since 2009. Since 2012, she is the Deputy Vice-president of Research and Development at Saint-Gobain.

Scientific work
Bernadette Charleux first worked on emulsion polymerization, which led to the creation of new materials :  functional latexes, amphiphilic copolymers, etc. before turning to pioneering research on Reversible-deactivation radical polymerization in aqueous media. More recently, she has worked on the creation of nano-objects via the self-assembly of macromolecules.

This work has led to numerous patents.

Prizes and distinctions 
 Chevalier de la Légion d'honneur (2013)
 CNRS Silver Medal (2012)
 The Prix Grammaticakis-Neuman of the French Academy of Sciences (2011)
 Société chimique de France Prize, Materials, polymers, and elastomers division (2000)
 CNRS Bronze Medal (1997)

Notes and references

External links 

French women chemists
21st-century French women scientists
Chevaliers of the Légion d'honneur
Members of Academia Europaea
Year of birth missing (living people)
Living people